Moni Bilé (born August 1957) is a Cameroonian makossa musician. He was the best-selling makossa performer of the 1980s, and his album Amour & Espérance was an international hit that extended the worldwide popularity of the genre.

References

Sources
 Hudgens, Jim, and Richard Trillo (1999). West Africa: The Rough Guide. Third ed. London: Rough Guides Ltd. 
 West, Ben (2004). Cameroon: The Bradt Travel Guide. Guilford, Connecticut: The Globe Pequot Press Inc. 

1957 births
Living people
Cameroonian musicians